Helle is a small village in Vaksdal municipality in Vestland county, Norway. Located northeast of Stanghelle, Helle is included in the urban area Stanghelle which has a population of 791 (in 2019). The European route E16 highway runs through the village.

References

Villages in Vestland
Vaksdal